Darragh \d(a)-rra-gh\ is a boys name of Irish origin. The name is derived from the Old Irish word daire (modern Irish doire), which means oak. Darragh is frequently used in Ireland as a masculine forename, though sometimes occurs as a surname or feminine forename. Darragh is related to the name Dáire. The spelling varies, with variations such as Dara, Daragh etc.

In Celtic mythology, Darragh also meant Dagda, the Celtic god of the underworld. It also means strength and perseverance.

People with surname Darragh
Adam Darragh (born 1979), Australian basketball player
Archibald B. Darragh (1840–1927), American politician
Cornelius Darragh (1809–1854), American politician
Harold Darragh (1902–1993), Canadian ice hockey player
Jack Darragh (1890–1924), Canadian ice hockey player
John Darragh (1772–1828), American politician
Lydia Darragh (1729–1789), Revolutionary war figure
Paul Darragh (1953–2005), Irish equestrian
Tina Darragh (born 1950), American poet

People with given name Darragh
Darragh Ennis (born 1988), Irish scientist and quizzer
Darragh Kenny (born 1988), Irish equestrian
Darragh Maguire (born 1976), Irish footballer
Darragh Morgan (born 1974), Irish musician
Darragh Mortell (born 1989) Actor/film-maker
Darragh Ó Sé (born 1975), Irish footballer
Darragh O'Brien (born 1974), Irish politician

Places called Darragh
 Darragh, Glenroe, County Limerick
 Darragh Cross, near Saintfield, County Down, Northern Ireland. (Darragh Cross on Google Maps)
 Darragh, County Clare, Ireland (Darragh County Clare on Google Maps)
 Darra, Queensland, Australia
 Darragh, Pennsylvania, USA
 Mount Darragh NSW Australia

See also
Dara

References

Irish masculine given names
Anglicised Irish-language surnames